The Phone Losers of America (PLA) is an internet prank call community founded in 1994 as a phone phreaking and hacking e-zine. Today the PLA hosts the popular prank call podcast the Snow Plow Show which it has hosted since 2012.

History 
The Phone Losers of America were founded in 1994, in an era when landlines were plentiful.

The PLA text files continued until mid-1997. In 2002, RBCP (Brad Carter) began an internet radio station which he called PLA Radio which still exists today as The Snow Plow Show, along with a Discord channel.

In the early 2000s, with the introduction of companies offering Caller ID Spoofing, groups such as the Phone Losers of America became notable in their utilisation of the service for prank calling, for example in the spoofing of law enforcement and corporate office numbers.

Activities

The Snow Plow Show
The Snow Plow Show is a comedy podcast featuring prank calls by the host, RBCP. The show was previously part of the Prank Call Nation network and releases episodes around once a week. As of 2021, this is the primary show hosted by RBCP. It includes both free full-length episodes and shorter "hobosodes" available for paying subscribers.

Live Shows
As of 2022, PLA hosts occasional live shows on Prankcast.com and Twitch. The shows vary between live prank calls, where chatroom members can listen in and offer suggestions, and a "Hang Up The Phone" show, where listeners can dial in. Listeners who follow PhoneLosers on Twitter or Prankcast can receive a notification when he goes live. Hang Up the Phone Show is co-hosted RBCP and Fresno Carl, who also voiced the Mr. Biggs comedy podcast. RBCP is also a frequent guest on other live prank call shows on Prankcast, including the weekly Take Your Pants Off show, hosted by comedian DevonAnustart.

World of Prank Calls
PLA maintains a separate website documenting external prank calls and linking to other prank call shows, located at worldofprankcalls.com. As of March 2022, a best of prank call compilation, called "Mr. Dobalina's Wonderful World of Prank Calls," is also still being actively released.

PLA Radio
In early 2001, RBCP started releasing almost-monthly audio comedy shows called PLA Radio. The shows feature comedy skits, commercials, parodies, and pranks. The show is released as a podcast and has been featured several times on iTunes and is regularly listed in the Top 10 on Podcast Alley.

PLA Community Forums

The PLA community forums are administrated by RBCP, and were established on March 21, 2006. 
There are currently over 1,600 registered users, with over 50,000 posts on topics mostly related to the PLA.

PLA: The Books
In 2010, the Phone Losers of America book was released.

In 2011, a second Phone Losers of America book was released, called Phone Losers of America: The Complete 'Zine Collection.   This book was an archive of all of the original issues of the PLA e-zine, in a mostly unedited format.

The e-zine
The PLA e-zine was originally distributed electronically via a dial-up BBS, with an option to buy the magazine and have it shipped by mail. The e-zines ended in mid-1997.

Other
The PLA maintains an archive of answer machine messages in text-based format, which Motherboard have described as being the "ringtones of their day".

Cactus
A "Cactus" has become the PLA's mascot, as well as catch-phrase. The origin of the word dates back to an old prank call by RBCP, where he would say nothing but the word "cactus," over and over. In common usage, It can be stated with a question mark "Cactus?" or as an exclamation "Cactus!" Similar "Cactus" themed prank calls are often made by PLA members. Themed prank calls were often made under the pseudonym, Mildred Monday, a reference to a woman Brad often prank called.

Legal issues
In early November 2016, Carter reported that the FBI performed an early-morning raid on his recording studio, resulting in a temporary seizure of all technical equipment. The raid was triggered by an attempt to access customer profiles at numerous retail stores across the country, primarily Safeway, of which some were utilized for prank phone calls. The case was treated as a federal matter, and was presided over by Judge Marco A. Hernandez of the Federal District Court of Oregon. On October 16, 2017, Judge Hernandez sentenced Carter to eight months of home detention, followed by five years of probation. Carter must pay $19,600 in restitution to Safeway as a consequence. The sentencing came after Carter accepted a plea agreement with the prosecution. Despite the plea deal, Carter remains a convicted felon.

Press
The PLA has regularly received a fair amount of attention from the media, beginning with a front page article in the Sunday issue of the Belleville News Democrat on September 3, 1995. An editorial was written several days later, followed by another front page article on the PLA a week later.

The website and zine received regular write ups in computer magazines such as The Net, The Web and Internet Underground throughout the 1990s. PLA received national attention in 2002, through a segment on Tech TV and then once again in 2005 when RBCP was interviewed live via satellite on CNBC's On The Money. PLA was also interviewed in 2005 for an article about Wal-Mart in the Boston Herald.

In August 2015, the Columbia Daily Tribune in Columbia, Missouri, featured the PLA in an article about a series of "strange calls" received by local residents who had signed a petition against a crosswalk construction project. The article quoted an FBI representative who allegedly told the Tribune that the calls to Columbia residents "would likely be prosecuted on the local level." However, no prosecution of the calls ever occurred.

See also

References

External links 
Official Phone Losers of America Web Site

American comedians
Hacker groups
Phreaking
Prank calling
1994 establishments in the United States
Internet properties established in 1994
Organizations established in 1994